Orthodox Celts is the debut album by Serbian Irish folk/Celtic rock band Orthodox Celts released in 1994. It is the only Orthodox Celts album which features only covers of Irish traditional songs.

Track listing
All the songs are covers of Irish traditional songs.

Personnel 
 Aleksandar Petrović – vocals
 Dejan Lalić – banjo, guitar, vocals
 Dušan Živanović – accordion, drums, percussion, vocals
 Ana Đokić – violin
 Predrag Guculj – bass, engineer, producer

Additional personnel
 Viktorija Jevtić – vocals
 Sava Đustibek – guitar
 Lusila Gluščević – flute
 Ljubomir Kunj - design

References

 Orthodox Celts at Discogs

External links 
 Orthodox Celts at Discogs

Orthodox Celts albums
1994 debut albums